Andrew Cutcliffe (born 2 July 1985) is an Australian film, television and theatre actor.

Career 
Cutcliffe studied acting at Sydney's Ensemble Studios before going on to work extensively in film, television and theatre. He made his professional theatre debut in the Gordon Frost Organisation production of Calendar Girls at the QPAC- which went on to tour Sydney and Melbourne and has gone onto appear in numerous theatre and musical theatre productions. Most recently he played the role of Malcolm Fraser in the new Australian musical The Dismissal at the Seymour Centre in Sydney to critical and popular acclaim.

Cutcliffe made his television debut with the role of Charles Maddox in Underbelly: Razor. In May 2015 it was announced that Andrew would appear in the popular Australian series Home and Away where he brought Pete Ashfield to life. He starred in the film Indigo Lake in 2017. He was a member of the KHODA group also composed of David Berry, Cooper George Amai, Lucas Glover and Kyle Sapsford.

Filmography

References 

Living people
1985 births
Australian male television actors
Australian male film actors
Australian male stage actors